Lutike is a village in Otepää Parish, Valga County, in southeastern Estonia, about  northeast of the town of Otepää. Lutike has a population of 27 (as of 1 January 2011).

There are several lakes located in the village. One of them is Lake Leigo, where the Leigo Lake Music Festival has been held annually since 1998.

The children's writer Leida Tigane has described the life in the village in the 1920s in her novel Seitse pastlapaari.

Gallery

References

External links
Leigo Tourist Farm and Lake Music Festival

Villages in Valga County